Nancy Cadogan (born 1979) is a British figurative painter. Her work ranges from still life to landscape and portrait.
She was named one of 'Top 20 New British Art Talents' by Tatler magazine in 2008, describing her as "the new Paula Rego".

Based on footfall (3,329 per day), Nancy Cadogan's solo show Mind Zero at the Saatchi Gallery was one of the top 100 exhibitions in the world in 2019.

Life and career
Born in Cincinnati, United States, Cadogan led a peripatetic early childhood, including stints in Crete and Cyprus with her father, the archaeologist Gerald Cadogan.
The family settled in the UK and Cadogan attended Oxford High School followed by City and Guilds of London Art School before graduating from Canterbury Christ Church University with a degree in Fine Art Painting in 2002.
She moved to New York shortly after, sharing a studio in the Starrett-Lehigh Building with artist Franco Ciarlo.

Success came quickly with sell-out solo shows at Frost & Reed, New York in 2005 and 2006, the former featuring “a series of dramatic paintings depicting the vast Utah landscapes.”
In 2008 Cadogan returned to the UK and followed her early success with another solo show at Sladmore Contemporary, London. 
With breaks for motherhood, she continues to paint from her studio in Northamptonshire and most recently featured in shows with Art Bastion. Miami, in Miami and Southampton, US and The Blue Edition in London.

In 2017, she was one of 93 women artists chosen to exhibit their work in The Ned, London, in its permanent Vault 100 exhibition highlighting the disparity between women and men CEOs.

Artistic style
Much of her earlier work focused on portrait and landscapes, and "demonstrate[s] a skillful and purposeful use of colour, balanced with planes and spaces that draw your eye out into large vistas."

In more recent work, which can be seen on Artsy and Art Sales Index, Nancy turns to the concepts of stillness and place, both in the sense of a still life and the various emotional connotations held semantically. Her works are deceptively simple but require deep reading. She has stated, "I am interested in stillness, not only in the sense of a still life and how that tradition explores the passing of time, but actual physical stillness." 
Critics have also noted her strong use of colour, particularly blues.

Cadogan's subject matter has included Morocco, Utah and Lake Como. In recent work Cadogan has focused on still lives, almost exclusively books. In one sense, the works are typical of the still life genre and record a sense of time passing. In another, they reflect on the concept of stillness more widely, as a rare condition within our hyper-networked contemporary reality, and instead celebrate quiet reflection. As Cadogan has stated, ‘The book – the actual physical paper bound object full of words – is a treasure in this modern era. A book contains an entire universe you can only bring to life in your imagination, if you agree to give it time. It is a tribute to privacy, an honouring of the interior life.'

In recent works Cadogan has chosen to focus on large-scale pieces reflecting the beauty of the every day and the inner life of the mind. Saatchi Gallery Director Philippa Adams stated, “Nancy’s works delightfully capture the sensation of being lost in one’s own thoughts. Their joyful exuberance brings a moment of reflection and calm in today’s uncertain world.”

Selected exhibitions

2002 Graduation Show, Mall Galleries, London
2003 Gallery 47, London
2005 Recent Paintings: Utah Landscapes.  Frost and Reed Gallery, NYC 
2004 Recent Paintings: Morocco. Frost and Reed Gallery, NYC
2005 Solo Show, Sextant Inc., NYC
2006 Grand Beginnings. GrandyArt, Arndean Gallery, London
2007  Group Show, GrandyArt, Smithfield Gallery, London
2008 Recent Paintings. Sladmore Contemporary, London
2011 Art for Charity Auction, Christie’s, Milan
2011 21st Chelsea Antiquarian Book Fair, London
2016 A Sense of Place. Art Bastion, Miami
2016 Art Southampton 2016, Miami
2016 The Blue Edition, 68 Kinnerton Street, London
2017 Still Reading, Shapero Modern/Sladmore Contemporary, London
2019 Mind Zero, Saatchi Gallery, London
2020 Wall of Small, Lyndsey Ingram Gallery, London
2020 Art from the Heart - NHS, Zuleika Gallery, London
2020 What we See, Gillian Jason Gallery, London
2020-2021 Gusto, Keats-Shelley House, Rome
2021 All The Good Things, The Cadogan, A Belmond Hotel, London

Family

Cadogan is the daughter of the archaeologist Gerald Cadogan, known for his work on the Myrtos Pyrgos Minoan site on Crete and the Maroni Vournes site on Cyprus.

She is married with three children and lives in Northamptonshire.

References

1979 births
British women painters
Living people
21st-century British women artists